Piqui Machay (possibly from Quechua piki flea, mach'ay cave, "flea cave") is a mountain in the Andes of Peru, about  high. It is situated in the Cusco Region, Quispicanchi Province, Marcapata District. It lies southeast of the mountains Vizcachani, Allincapac and Huanacune. At the northern slopes of Piqui Machay there is a little lake named Jomercocha.

References 

Mountains of Cusco Region
Mountains of Peru